Constantin Eustathiades (Athens, 1912 – Athens, 29 June 1979) was a Greek jurist. He served on the European Commission of Human Rights from  1954 to 1970 and the International Law Commission from 1967 to 1971.

References

1912 births
1979 deaths
International Law Commission officials
20th-century Greek jurists
International law scholars
People from Athens
Members of the European Commission of Human Rights
Greek judges of international courts and tribunals